Mary Garcia may refer to:

 Mary Helen Garcia (born 1937), member of the New Mexico House of Representatives
 Mary Jane Garcia (born 1936), member of the New Mexico Senate